Royal Van Oord is a Dutch maritime contracting company that specializes in dredging, land reclamation and constructing man made islands. Royal Van Oord has undertaken many projects throughout the world, including land reclamation, dredging and beach nourishment. The company has one of the world's largest dredging fleets.<ref>Dredging, Rabobank, sept 2013'</ref>

History

The company was founded by Govert van Oord in 1868. In 1990 it acquired Aannemers Combinatie Zinkwerken ('ACZ') and in 2003 it acquired Ballast HAM Dredging (formed from the merger of Ballast Nedam's dredging division with Hollandse Aanneming Maatschappij ('HAM') two years earlier). King Willem-Alexander of the Netherlands awarded Van Oord the right to use the designation "Koninklijk"'' (Royal) on 23 November 2018.

Major projects
Projects undertaken by the company include the Oosterscheldekering between Schouwen-Duiveland and Noord-Beveland completed in 1986, the Palm Jumeirah in Dubai completed in 2003, the IJsselmeer pipeline in the Netherlands completed in 2006 and the World in Dubai completed in 2008. A US sales and support office was opened in Houston Texas in 2010.

In December 2016, the company entered a consortium with partners Shell, Eneco, and Mitsubishi/DGE and was awarded the Borssele 3 and 4 project. It was obtained for the strike price of 54.50 euro cents per megawatt-hour, the Netherlands’ lowest-ever strike price at that time.

In mid-2018, Van Oord announced the acquisition of MPI Offshore from the Vroon Group. MPI Offshore has specialized in offshore wind installations since 2003 as a contractor. Van Oord also takes over the two ships and crew. The transaction is subject to antitrust clearance, but is expected to close by the end of September 2018. Van Oord is mainly strengthening its position in the British offshore wind energy market.

Subsidiaries

References

External links

Royal Van Oord official website

Dredging companies
Multinational companies headquartered in the Netherlands
Companies based in Rotterdam